Bob Rosa is an American record producer who has worked with artists such as Madonna, Janet Jackson, Mariah Carey and Espen Lind. One of his first recording projects was working on the track "Planet Rock" by Afrika Bambaataa & the Soulsonic Force in 1982.

Overview
Rosa's recording career has encompassed every genre of music, mixing pop, rock, dance, R&B and Latin. He has mixed the successful singles "Gonna Make You Sweat" by C&C Music Factory; Whitney Houston's "I'm Every Woman", Mariah Carey's "Emotions", *NSYNC's "God Must Have Spent A Little More Time On You". He also received two Grammy Award nominations for Best Dance Track for remixes of Gloria Estefan's "Heaven's What I Feel" and "Don't Let This Moment End", a Latin Grammy win in 2002 for his work on Alejandra Guzmán's Soy album, and a Grammy win for the Best Reggae Album by Toots & The Maytals in 2005 (True Love).

Discography

2009 Party Groove: Gaydays, Vol. 6 DJ Randy Bettis   Mixing
2009 Human Ari Gold Mixing
2008 Where the Music Takes You Ari Gold   Mastering
2008 Pacha NY Jonathan Peters   Mixing
2008 Music Box/Butterfly Mariah Carey   Engineer, Mixing
2008 King of Pop Michael Jackson   Producer, Mixing
2008 King of Pop [UK Deluxe Edition] Michael Jackson   Producer
2008 King of Pop [Australia] Michael Jackson   Producer, Mixing
2008 Greatest [CD/2 DVD] Duran Duran   Mixing
2008 All Out of Love Jenna Drey   Mixing
2007 Very Best of Mick Jagger Mick Jagger   Engineer
2007 Very Best of Mick Jagger [Limited Deluxe Edition] [CD Mick Jagger   Engineer
2007 Transport Systems Ari Gold   Executive Producer, Drum Programming, Mastering, Mixing
2007 To Mars from Babylon Big Bang Radio   Producer, Engineer, Mixing
2007 Perfect Playlist Dance, Vol. 3 Various Artists   Mixing
2006 Ultimate Prince   Mixing
2006 Ultimate Prince Mixing
2006 One Step Further Jenna Drey Mixing
2006 Hurt Christina Aguilera Mixing
2006 Dance Party 2007 The Happy Boys   Mixing
2006 By the Way [6 Tracks] Jenna Drey   Mixing 
2006 Blood on the Dance Floor/Invincible Michael Jackson   Producer, Mixing
2005 Why Should I Believe You: The Remixes Jenna Drey Mastering, Mixing
2005 Same Dream [Bonus Tracks] Jon Secada   Composer, Producer, Engineer, Mixing
2005 Greatest Hits *NSYNC Mixing
2005 Apasionada Ednita Nazario Mixing
2005 A Mi Manera Inés Gaviria   Mixing
2005 100% Black Novenoe Volumen [DVD] Various Artists   Engineer, Mixing
2004 Wonderful Life Lara Fabian   Engineer
2004 Two Shots Matt Dusk Engineer
2004 True Love Toots & the Maytals   Engineer
2004 True Love [Import Version] Toots & the Maytals   Engineer
2004 Singles 1986–1995 Duran Duran   Mixing
2004 Singles 1986–1995 Duran Duran Mixing
2004 Navidad Con Sabor Reggaeton Various Artists   Mixing
2004 Go All Night Del Producer, Mixing
2004 Bangin 3: Progressive Beats DJ Escape   Producer
2003 Universal Smash Hits, Vol. 2 Various Artists   Mixing
2003 Sunshine After Rain Rita Marley Mixing
2003 Roc Ya Body (Mic Check 1, 2) [CD #1] M.V.P. (Most Valuable Playas)   Mixing
2003 MVP M.V.P. (Most Valuable Playas)   Mixing, Assistant Producer
2003 Justin Guarini Justin Guarini Assistant Vocal Engineer
2003 For You Jonathan Pierce Mixing
2003 Ednita Por Ti Ednita Nazario Engineer, Mixing
2003 Becstasy Becky Baeling Mixing
2003 20th Century Masters - The Millennium Collection: The Vanessa Williams   Producer, Sampling, Beats
2002 Walk to Remember Original Soundtrack Mixing
2002 Volume Flipp   Producer
2002 Unison/Celine Dion/The Colour of My Love Celine Dion   Mixing
2002 Medicine Man Richie Booker   Mixing
2002 Marie Sisters Marie Sisters   Mixing
2002 Emotions/Vanishing Mariah Carey Mixing
2002 Collection: Unison/Celine Dion/The Colour of My Love Celine Dion   Mixing 2002 Collection 98°   Engineer, Mixing
2002 Border Girl by Paulina Rubio Engineer, Mixing, Vocal Engineer, Vocal Producer
2001 Stranger Than Fiction Ultra Naté   Engineer
2001 Soy Alejandra Guzmán Engineer
2001 Settie Settie   Mixing
2001 No Tellin' Lies/3.V Zebra   Programming, Engineer
2001 Music Box/Emotions/Mariah Carey Mariah Carey Mixing Engineer
2001 M.Y.O.B Deborah Gibson Arranger, Recorder, Mixing
2001 Looking for the Perfect Beat: 1980–1985 Afrika Bambaataa   Engineer
2001 Greatest Hits, Vol. II Gloria Estefan Mixing
2001 Greatest Hits, Vol. 2 [Bonus Track] Gloria Estefan   Mixing
2001 FB Entertainment Presents: The Good Life Various Artists   Engineer, Mixing
2001 FB Entertainment Presents: The Good Life [Clean] Various Artists   Engineer, Mixing
2000 Smooth Jams: New R&B Essentials Various Artists   Producer
2000 Revelation 98°   Mixing
2000 Revelation [Import Bonus Track] 98°   Mixing
2000 Phoenix Stone Phoenix Stone Mixing
2000 New R&B Essentials Various Artists   Producer
2000 Blow It Out Your Ass Flipp Producer, Mixing
2000 Average Day Aztek Trip   Mixing
1999 Smoke This Lynch Mob Mixing
1999 Heat It Up 98°   Producer, Engineer, Mixing, Mixing Engineer
1999 Celine Dion/Unison Celine Dion   Mixing
1998 Where We Belong [Universal] Boyzone   Mixing
1998 Welcome to the Epidrome Various Artists   Remixing
1998 I Think Too Much Settie   Mixing
1998 Hello Laila Laila   Mixing
1998 Hard Knock Life [CD5/Cassette Single] Jay-Z   Remixing, Audio Production
1998 Greatest Duran Duran Mixing
1998 Greatest [Deluxe Edition] Duran Duran   Mixing
1998 Greatest [Deluxe Edition] [Clean] Duran Duran   Mixing
1998 Greatest [Bonus DVD] Duran Duran   Mixing
1998 Greatest Hits: The First Ten Years Vanessa Williams   Producer, Sampling, Beats
1998 Greatest Hits [Warlock] The Cover Girls   Mixing
1998 Gloria! Gloria Estefan Mixing
1998 98° and Rising 98°   Engineer, Mixing
1998 98° and Rising [Holland Bonus Tracks] 98°   Engineer, Mixing
1998 *NSYNC [Japan Bonus Tracks] *NSYNC   Mixing
1998 *NSYNC [Australia] *NSYNC   Mixing
1998 *NSYNC [Australian Bonus Tracks] *NSYNC   Mixing
1998 #1's Mariah Carey Engineer, Mixing
1998 #1's [Import Bonus Tracks] Mariah Carey   Engineer, Mixing Engineer
1997 You Don't Know [US #2] Cyndi Lauper   Engineer, Mixing
1997 Secada Jon Secada Engineer, Remixing, Mixing
1997 Secada [Spanish Version] Jon Secada   Engineer, Remixing, Mixing
1997 Samantha Cole Samantha Cole Mixing
1997 Red Espen Lind   Producer, Mixing
1997 Power 106 FM: 10th Anniversary Compilation Various Artists   Producer
1997 One More Time The Real McCoy   Engineer, Mixing
1997 Like a Star Cynthia   Mixing
1997 I'd Really Love to See You Tonight [Single] Barry Manilow   Engineer, Mixing
1997 I'd Really Love to See You Tonight (Dance Mixes) Barry Manilow   Producer, Engineer, Mixing
1997 Free (Yes I'm Free) Nancey Jackson   Mixing
1997 Dame Un Poco Mas Nayobe   Remixing
1997 Blood on the Dance Floor: History in the Mix Michael Jackson Producer, Mixing
1997 Blood on the Dance Floor [4 Track Single] Michael Jackson Mixing
1997 Alan, Elvis & God Something Happens   Mixing
1996 Waiting for Your Love Stevie B   Mixing
1996 Vibrolush Vibrolush   Mixing
1996 Vibrolush Vibrolush   Mixing
1996 For Old Times Sake: The Freddie Jackson Story Freddie Jackson   Engineer
1996 For Old Times Sake: The Freddie Jackson Story Freddie Jackson   Engineer
1996 Cutting's Ultimate Freestyle Medleys, Vol. 1 Various Artists   Mixing
1996 100% Pure Dance Various Artists   Mixing
1995 We've Got It Goin On [Import] Backstreet Boys   Mixing
1995 Ultimate C+C Music Factory   Engineer
1995 Sister Act 2: Back in the Habit Original Soundtrack   Engineer, Mixing
1995 Greetings from the Gutter Dave Stewart Mixing
1995 Greatest Hits Taylor Dayne Mixing
1995 Greatest Hits Laura Branigan   Mixing
1995 Best of Tina B: Honey to a Bee Tina B   Engineer
1995 Best of Branigan Laura Branigan   Mixing
1994 Storyteller Crystal Waters   Mixing
1994 Star Funk, Vol. 12 Various Artists   Engineer, Mixing
1994 Robi-Rob's Boriqua Anthem C+C Music Factory Featuring Trilogy   Producer, Engineer, Mixing
1994 Greatest Hits (1980–1994) Aretha Franklin   Engineer, Mixing
1994 Anything Goes! C+C Music Factory Producer, Engineer, Mixing
1993 Toni Braxton Toni Braxton Mixing
1993 Toni Braxton [Bonus Track] Toni Braxton   Mixing
1993 Send Me a Lover [Arista #1] Taylor Dayne   Mixing
1993 Music Box Mariah Carey Engineer, Mixing
1993 Music Box [Bonus Track] Mariah Carey   Mixing
1993 Love Remembers George Benson Mixing
1993 Hits 1 Prince Mixing
1992 Salutations from the Ghetto Nation Warrior Soul   Engineer, Mixing
1992 Salutations from the Ghetto Nation Warrior Soul Engineer, Mixing
1992 Healing Stevie B   Mixing
1992 Greatest Remixes Vol. 1 Clivillés & Cole   Editing, Mixing
1992 Greatest Hitz: Cash Cash Money Prince Charles & the City Beat Band   Engineer
1992 Don't Stop...Planet Rock (The Remix EP) Afrika Bambaataa & the Soulsonic Force Engineer
1992 Bodyguard Original Soundtrack Mixing
1992 Bodyguard [Japan Bonus Track] Original Soundtrack   Mixing
1991 Straight Outta Hell's Kitchen Lisa Lisa & Cult Jam Editing, Mixing
1991 Mistaken Identity Donna Summer   Engineer
1991 Let the Beat Hit 'Em [Single] Lisa Lisa & Cult Jam   Engineer, Editing, Mixing
1991 Here We Go [CD Single] C+C Music Factory   Mixing
1991 Emotions Mariah Carey Mixing
1991 Comfort Zone Vanessa Williams Sampling, Beats, Production Concept, Sample Programming
1990 Vertigo Boxcar Remixing
1990 Unison Celine Dion Mixing
1990 Smart Pack Debbie Gibson   Engineer
1990 Shut Up and Dance: Dance Mixes Paula Abdul   Remixing
1990 Remixed Prayers Madonna   Remixing
1990 Hack Information Society   Engineer, Mixing
1990 Gonna Make You Sweat C+C Music Factory/Clivilles & Cole Mixing
1990 Fox Akio Dobashi   Engineer, Mixing
1989 Passion in the Heart Shirley Lewis   Mixing
1989 Home Stephanie Mills Mixing
1989 Decade: Greatest Hits Duran Duran Mixing
1988 Will Downing Will Downing   Engineer, Mixing
1988 Tommy Page Tommy Page Mixing
1988 New Age Bach: The Goldberg Variations Joel Spiegelman   Engineer
1987 Walter Beasley Walter Beasley Engineer, Mixing
1987 Walter Beasley [Circuit City Exclusive] Walter Beasley   Engineer, Mixing
1987 Sensational Starpoint   Engineer
1987 Primitive Cool Mick Jagger Engineer
1987 Picture Me Ava Cherry   Engineer
1987 Let It Be Me Audrey Wheeler   Engineer, Mixing
1987 Hunger Michael Bolton Engineer, Mixing
1987 Control: The Remixes Janet Jackson   Remixing
1986 Never Felt So Good James Ingram   Drums
1986 Just Like the First Time Freddie Jackson Engineer
1986 Genobia Genobia Jeter   Mixing
1986 Destiny Chaka Khan Engineer
1986 Book of Love Book of Love Mixing
1985 Standing on the Edge Cheap Trick   Engineer
1985 Standing on the Edge [Bonus Track] Cheap Trick   Engineer
1985 Rock Me Tonight Freddie Jackson Engineer
1985 Restless Starpoint   Engineer
1985 9.9 9.9   Drums, Mixing
1984 Tina B Tina B   Engineer
1984 No Tellin' Lies Zebra Programming, Engineer
1984 Combat Zone Prince Charles & the City Beat Band
1983 Planet Patrol Planet Patrol   Engineer
1982 Stone Killers Prince Charles & the City Beat Band   Engineer, Mixing
1981 Gang War Prince Charles & the City Beat Band   Engineer, Mixing

References

External links
Official webpage of Bob Rosa

American record producers
Living people
Year of birth missing (living people)